Asif A. Ghazanfar (born 20 April 1972) is an American neuroscientist. He received one of the two Troland Research Awards for 2013.

He was born in Pullman, Washington. He graduated from University of Idaho with a degree in philosophy in 1994 and received his Ph.D from Duke University in 1999.

In 2014 his lab was the subject of a complaint by People for the Ethical Treatment of Animals with respect to treatment of an animal subject. While the investigation found that the marmoset involved had not been harmed or mistreated, it also found that the use of a ferret exercise ball during the research project in question "had not been submitted for approval by the University's Institutional Animal Care and Use Committee (IACUC) as required for all animal research procedures."

He is a member of the Editorial Board for Current Biology.

He is the head of college for the Princeton University residential college Yeh College.

References 

1972 births
American neuroscientists
Living people